In predicate logic, existential generalization (also known as existential introduction, ∃I) is a valid rule of inference that allows one to move from a specific statement, or one instance, to a quantified generalized statement, or existential proposition. In first-order logic, it is often used as a rule for the existential quantifier in formal proofs.

Example: "Rover loves to wag his tail. Therefore, something loves to wag its tail."

Example: "Alice made herself a cup of tea. Therefore, Alice made someone a cup of tea."

Example: "Alice made herself a cup of tea. Therefore, someone made someone a cup of tea."

In the Fitch-style calculus:

Quine 
According to Willard Van Orman Quine, universal instantiation and existential generalization are two aspects of a single principle, for instead of saying that  implies , we could as well say that the denial  implies . The principle embodied in these two operations is the link between quantifications and the singular statements that are related to them as instances. Yet it is a principle only by courtesy. It holds only in the case where a term names and, furthermore, occurs referentially.

See also
Inference rules

References

Rules of inference
Predicate logic